Mouila Ville Airport  is an airport serving the town of Mouila, in Ngounié Province, Gabon.

Airlines and destinations

See also

 List of airports in Gabon
 Transport in Gabon

References

External links
Mouila Airport
OpenStreetMap - Mouila
OurAirports - Mouila

Airports in Gabon